Bottom of the World may refer to:

Locations
 The Mariana Trench, specifically the Challenger Deep
 Antarctica, specifically the South Pole
 Anywhere on the Southern Hemisphere
 Australia, see Down Under

Media
 Bottom of the World (film), a 2017 film
 "Bottom of the World" (Defiance), the tenth episode of the second season of the American science fiction series Defiance
 "Bottom of the World", a song by Tom Waits